Puppet, Pauper, Pirate, poet, Pawn and King is the second greatest hits album by Australian singer-songwriter Stephen Cummings. The album was released in October 1997.

Reception
Bernard Zuel from Sydney Morning Herald gave the album 4 out of 5 saying "These are soul songs of Melbourne.. of the literate and the tongue-tied. Of all of us, really."

Peter Jordan from Sydney Morning Herald said "Despite relative anonymity and an absence from the charts, Cummings has produced an outstanding body of work that, in its maturity, style and consistency, is unique in Australian popular music. This "Best Of" compilation covers more than a decade of solo work, but also includes three new songs. The material ranges from the aching and fragile beauty of 'I Fell From a Great Height' to the almost psychedelic reverie of 'Sometimes' and the country-tinged 'When Love Comes Back to Haunt You'.

Jason Ankeny from AllMusic gave the album 4 out of 5 describing the album as "a compilation of ex-Sports frontman Stephen Cummings' somber solo work, highlighted by the melancholy 'I Fell from a Great Height', "Slowly Going to Pieces" and "When Love Comes Back to Haunt You."

Track listing

Release history

References 

1997 compilation albums
Compilation albums by Australian artists
Stephen Cummings albums
Polydor Records compilation albums